The eighteenth season of British science fiction television series Doctor Who consisted of seven four-episode serials broadcast from 30 August 1980 with the serial The Leisure Hive, to 21 March 1981 with the serial Logopolis. The season is Tom Baker's final as the Fourth Doctor before his regeneration into the Fifth Doctor (Peter Davison), as well as Lalla Ward's as companion Romana II and John Leeson's as the voice of K9. The season also sees the debut of Matthew Waterhouse as Adric, Sarah Sutton as Nyssa, and Janet Fielding as Tegan Jovanka, the three of whom would remain regular companions into the Fifth Doctor's era, as well as the return of the Master, portrayed both by Geoffrey Beevers and Anthony Ainley. 

The season was the first to be produced by John Nathan-Turner, who would produce every season of the show until 1989, and the first to feature script editor Christopher H. Bidmead. The season features a trilogy of connected serials, Full Circle, State of Decay, and Warrior's Gate, which form a trilogy set in a "bubble universe" called E-Space, as well as The Keeper of Traken and Logopolis, the first two serials of a trilogy continued in season 19's Castrovalva, centered on the return of the Master and the regeneration of the Fourth Doctor.

Cast

Main cast 
 Tom Baker as the Fourth Doctor
 Lalla Ward as Romana
 John Leeson as Voice of K9
 Matthew Waterhouse as Adric
 Sarah Sutton as Nyssa
 Janet Fielding as Tegan Jovanka

Season 18 is the final season of Tom Baker as the Fourth Doctor after seven years in the  role.
New companions Adric (Matthew Waterhouse), Nyssa (Sarah Sutton), and Tegan Jovanka (Janet Fielding) make their introductions in Full Circle, The Keeper of Traken, and Logopolis, respectively. 
Romana, played by Lalla Ward, departs from the series in Warriors' Gate, along with John Leeson who returns to voice the robot K9. With the arrival of Adric, this season marks the first time since 1967 that the Doctor has three regular travelling companions in the TARDIS.

Guest stars
The Master returned to the show, this time played by Geoffrey Beevers, in The Keeper of Traken. After the events of Traken, the Master was thereafter played by Anthony Ainley, who would continue in the part for the rest of the classic series' run.

Jacqueline Hill, who had played the First Doctor's companion Barbara Wright, returned in Meglos, although playing a different character, the alien priestess Lexa.

Serials 

For Season 18 John Nathan-Turner replaces Graham Williams as producer. Barry Letts returns now as executive producer, for just this season. Christopher H. Bidmead also replaces Douglas Adams as script editor. In a return to the format of early seasons, virtually all serials from Seasons 18 through 20 are linked together, often running directly into each other. Three serials – Full Circle, State of Decay, and Warriors' Gate – are part of a trilogy within the season. These three serials include the arrival of Adric and the departure of Romana and K9.

Over the period of Christmas 1980, the season took a two-week transmission break between the broadcasts of State of Decay and Warriors' Gate.

Broadcast
The entire season was broadcast from 30 August 1980 to 21 March 1981.

Home media

VHS releases

DVD and Blu-ray releases

In print

Notes

References

Bibliography

 

1980 British television seasons
1981 British television seasons
Season 18
Season 18
18